Group A of the 2012 Fed Cup Asia/Oceania Zone Group I was one of four pools in the Asia/Oceania zone of the 2012 Fed Cup. Three teams competed in a round robin competition, with the top team and the bottom team proceeding to their respective sections of the play-offs: the top team played for advancement to the World Group II Play-offs, while the bottom team faced potential relegation to Group II.

Uzbekistan vs. Chinese Taipei

China vs. Chinese Taipei

China vs. Uzbekistan

References

External links
 Fed Cup website

2012 Fed Cup Asia/Oceania Zone